Phanogomphus kurilis, the Pacific clubtail, is a species of clubtail in the dragonfly family Gomphidae. It is found in the western United States.

The IUCN conservation status of Phanogomphus kurilis is "LC", least concern, with no immediate threat to the species' survival. The IUCN status was assessed in 2016.

References

External links

 

Gomphidae